Princess Elizabeth of Clarence (Elizabeth Georgiana Adelaide; 10 December 1820 – 4 March 1821) was a member of the British royal family. She was the second daughter of the Duke and Duchess of Clarence and St Andrews, later King William IV and Queen Adelaide. Princess Elizabeth was a granddaughter of King George III.

Elizabeth was born on 10 December 1820 during the reign of her uncle George IV at St James's Palace, and was christened that day at the Palace by William Howley, then Bishop of London.

After "being suddenly seized with the fatal disease, an intro-susception of the bowels" she died shortly thereafter, aged 12 weeks. She was buried at Windsor Castle, in St George's Chapel, on 10 March 1821.

References 

1820 births
1821 deaths
19th-century British people
19th-century British women
British princesses
Children of William IV of the United Kingdom
House of Hanover
Burials at St George's Chapel, Windsor Castle
Royalty and nobility who died as children
Daughters of kings